Kałków may refer to the following places:
Kałków, Masovian Voivodeship (east-central Poland)
Kałków, Opole Voivodeship (south-west Poland)
Kałków, Świętokrzyskie Voivodeship (south-central Poland)